This is a list of major Democratic Party candidates for president. The Democratic Party has existed since the dissolution of the Democratic-Republican Party in the 1820s, and the Democrats have nominated a candidate for president in every presidential election since the party's first convention in 1832. The list is divided into two sections, reflecting the increasing importance of primaries and caucuses following the changes stemming from the McGovern–Fraser Commission.

Only those candidates are included who were major contenders of the primaries and caucuses, and had held significant elective office or received substantial media coverage. Also, all those people are included who received at-least one delegate in the convention.

Candidates

1972-present

1832-1968 
These pre-1972 candidates won at least 10% of the delegates on at least one convention ballot.

Notes and references

Notes

References 

Candidates
Democratic
Presidential candidates